Carenidium is a genus of ground beetles in the family Carabidae. There are more than 20 described species in Carenidium, found in Australia.

Species
These 22 species belong to the genus Carenidium:

 Carenidium aberrans (Sloane, 1897)
 Carenidium atrum Sloane, 1916
 Carenidium bicornutum (W.J.MacLeay, 1887)
 Carenidium bifurcum Sloane, 1916
 Carenidium chaudoirii W.J.MacLeay, 1887
 Carenidium damelii W.J.MacLeay, 1869
 Carenidium darlingense W.J.MacLeay, 1887
 Carenidium frenchi Sloane, 1916
 Carenidium gagatinum (W.J.MacLeay, 1864)
 Carenidium leai Sloane, 1897
 Carenidium longipenne Sloane, 1907
 Carenidium modestum (Sloane, 1888)
 Carenidium mucronatum (W.J.MacLeay, 1866)
 Carenidium pertenue Sloane, 1916
 Carenidium purpuratum Sloane, 1905
 Carenidium pyripenne Sloane, 1900
 Carenidium riverinae (W.J.MacLeay, 1865)
 Carenidium sapphirinum Bates, 1874
 Carenidium septentrionale W.J.MacLeay, 1887
 Carenidium spaldingii W.J.MacLeay, 1878
 Carenidium superbum (Laporte, 1867)
 Carenidium tropicale W.J.MacLeay, 1887

References

Scaritinae